Kirti M. Doongursee College (also known as Kirti M. Doongursee College of Arts, Science and Commerce and Kirti College) is located in Dadar (West), Mumbai-400028 Maharashtra, India.

History
The college was founded by the Deccan Education Society as Bombay College. The foundation stone was laid by Maharshi Dhondo Keshav Karve and the college started operating in 1954. In 1960, Bombay College was renamed Kirti M. Doongursee College in a ceremony in the presence of Dr. Sarvepalli Radhakrishnan, the first Vice President of India.

It is affiliated to the University of Mumbai and offers an extensive range of courses.

One of its most well known alumni is Sachin Tendulkar, whose father Ramesh Tendulkar used to teach at the college.

Notable alumni
 Sachin Tendulkar
 Pravin Amre

 Anjali Bhagwat
 Amol Muzumdar
 Boman Irani
Rajesh Mapuskar
 Nilesh Pingle
 Sudhir Joshi
Srinivas Narasimha Prabhu
 Manya Surve

References

External links
http://www.kirticollege.org/
 College IT-CS Department festival

Educational institutions established in 1954
Universities and colleges in Mumbai
1954 establishments in Bombay State
Deccan Education Society